Porch sitting, i.e., sitting on a front porch or stoop, usually of a private residence is a leisure activity which can be a direct or indirect form of social interaction. This activity is a staple of most urban areas in the United States, and helps contribute to a lively atmosphere, for those sitting and also those passing by. This activity is most common during good weather, especially on warm summer nights and weekends.

Porch sitting was once considered to be a status symbol.

As well as being a good way to connect with neighbors, it also is an important form of community security, helping to prevent crime. Front porches were originally mandated in the planned community of Seaside, Florida, as a way to reduce air conditioning usage. Its planners then perceived an enhanced sense of community and front porches subsequently became an important element in the New Urbanism movement. During the summer of 2006, All Things Considered broadcast a series of stories dedicated to the role of the front porch in American life and literature.

There are now thousands of (tongue-in-cheek) Professional Porch Sitters Unions in all fifty states of the U.S. and at least three other countries.

Sitting equipment 

 In certain Brazilian fishing households, families may use stools.
 Some porches have rocking-chairs.
 Some porches have swings.

Sociology 

Some see a potential downside of sitting on porches: the intrusiveness of porch-based surveillance.

Decline
On hot summer days, it was formerly cooler out on the porch than it was inside the house.  Air conditioning has thus replaced porch sitting, enabling people able to socialize in the comfort of their homes, although porch sitting is still common in areas where the climate is warm.

Other causes of a decline of porch sitting are television, which provides other entertaining sights, and the motor car, which made street views more noisy and unpleasant.

In popular culture 
"Porch-sitters" form a recognized group in marketing
and in literature.

Henry Church, an aged ex-British soldier from the American Revolutionary War, was noted for his porch sitting in sight of the train station. The town of Hundred, West Virginia, was then named after him, as he was called "Old Hundred."

The Don Knotts Show had a regular feature, The Front Porch, in which the host and his guest would sit in rocking chairs in a porch and talk philosophically. When Knotts played Barney Fife on The Andy Griffith Show, porch sitting was often incorporated into the sitcom's script. Another television series which featured Southern porch sitting, albeit in a more rural setting, was the family drama The Waltons.

The ethnic slur "porch monkey" is an insinuation that African Americans spend excessive amount of time porch sitting.

In the film Friday, the main characters spend most of their day porch sitting.

Footnotes

External links

Bibliography
 This edition includes a new foreword written by the author.

American culture
Leisure activities
Architecture articles needing expert attention
Sitting